Lightning Warrior Raidy II: Temple of Desire is a dungeon crawling Role-playing Eroge developed by ZyX, and later translated to English by G-Collections, currently known as JastUSA. 

It is both a sequel to Lightning Warrior Raidy and a remake of the second game.

Gameplay
Lightning Warrior Raidy II combines traditional turn-based battle with elements of visual novels. Unlike its predecessor, it uses limited animation for some scenes instead of simple static images. Maps, which had to be located in the first game, are now automatically created as Raidy progresses through a dungeon. There are new equipment types, items, skills such as Extasy Slash, weapons including the ultimate Sexcalibur, and gameplay elements such as commerce, dual-wielding weapons, and a new charge-based Thunder Slash special attack called Thunder Blast.

All fights in the game are one-on-one. Whenever the protagonist Raidy defeats a boss, she punishes them through various kinds of sexual violation and the bosses too erotically rape her in case if they win. Defeating a regular female enemy also shows her undressed and humiliated.

Plot

Characters

: The protagonist of the game. She is a warrior with a mysterious power to control lightning.
Gav: The main antagonist of the story who seems to be stealing the life force of young girls for an unknown but clearly sinister purpose.
: The beautiful proprietress of the Lake Blue Inn, Setia is a sociable girl who takes an immediate liking to Raidy after she is saved from the clutches of Jammy's bandit gang. She has strong lesbian tendencies.
: Lake Blue's cheerful town blacksmith. She has a fetish for weapons, and sometimes uses them as masturbation aids.

Development and release

The game was first released in Japan under the title  on December 22, 1995 for MS-DOS. A version for Windows 95, FM Towns and PC-9821 was released on March 22, 1996.

, a bundle containing remade editions of both Ikazuchi no Senshi Raidy and Ikazuchi no Senshi Raidy II was released for Windows XP on March 30, 2007. On October 26, 2012, a bundle for containing all three games in the series on DVD-ROM for Windows XP, Windows Vista, and Windows 7 was released, entitled .

The beta testing and postproduction phase of the English translation started on March 11, 2010. Pre-orders were opened the same day. The English version began shipping to customers on June 29, 2010. The game features original music composed by HT-Sound, including one vocal track, "Blade of Thunder," performed by Sakuya Kurosaki.

Reception
Virtual Sex Games similarly opined "Lightning Warrior Raidy II Temple of Desire may not be the best RPG around. But for sure, it is a great looking hentai RPG."

Legacy 
A third game simply titled Lightning Warrior Raidy III was released afterwards. Unlike previous releases, Raidy III is a completely original sequel continuing from the remakes and features an armor fusion system that allows Raidy to combine her soul with the first game's bosses, giving her a completely new look or changing her race entirely and thus giving her new abilities, all while trying to pay off a humongous tab she didn't amass by her own means. Raidy III was again localized by JastUSA and has also received a spin-off titled Raidy 3.5 ~Forres Kiki Ippatsu~ that has yet to be brought westward.

Adaptations
Raidy Comic Anthology was available by mail order.

References

External links
G-Collections page
JAST USA page
ZyX page: Windows 95, Windows 98 

MobyGames page: Windows 95 version and  Windows 98 version

1996 video games
DOS games
Dungeon crawler video games
Fantasy video games
FM Towns games
NEC PC-9801 games
Japanese role-playing video games
Single-player video games
Video game remakes
Video games developed in Japan
Video games featuring female protagonists
Visual novels
Windows games
Yuri (genre) video games
ZyX (brand) games